Dumitru Pavlovici (26 April 1912 – 28 September 1993) was a Romanian football goalkeeper who played for Romania in the 1938 FIFA World Cup.

Honours
Ripensia Timișoara
Liga I (3): 1934–35, 1935–36, 1937–38
Cupa României (2): 1933–34, 1935–36

References

External links

1912 births
1993 deaths
Romanian footballers
Romania international footballers
Romanian people of Serbian descent
Association football goalkeepers
Liga I players
FC Ripensia Timișoara players
FC CFR Timișoara players
1938 FIFA World Cup players
Sportspeople from Timișoara